The 1959 Milwaukee Braves season was the seventh season for the franchise in Milwaukee and its 89th season overall. The season's home attendance  second in the majors and the eight-team National League, but the lowest to date in Milwaukee and the last over 1.5 million.

Offseason 
 December 1, 1958: Claude Raymond was drafted from the Braves by the Chicago White Sox in the 1958 rule 5 draft.
 March 31, 1959: Gene Conley, Harry Hanebrink and Joe Koppe were traded by the Braves to the Philadelphia Phillies for Johnny O'Brien, Ted Kazanski, and Stan Lopata.

Front-office turnover
Three days after the conclusion of the World Series in 1958, which the Braves lost in seven games to the New York Yankees, the club announced a reorganization of its front office.  Team president Joseph Cairnes stepped aside, and was succeeded by former Cincinnati Redlegs manager Birdie Tebbetts, 46.  Named executive vice president, and ranked just below owner Louis Perini on the Braves' organizational chart, Tebbetts had never before served in a front-office capacity in baseball.

The repercussions of Tebbetts' appointment to a senior management post were felt three months later when general manager John J. Quinn, 50, a member of the team's front office since 1936 (as well as the son of former owner J. A. Robert Quinn) and the Braves' GM since 1945, resigned on January 14, 1959, to take the reins of the  Quinn was replaced in Milwaukee by Tebbetts' former teammate with the Detroit Tigers, 37-year-old John McHale, GM of the Tigers   McHale would serve as the Braves' general manager and, later, team president, through the club's final years in Milwaukee and its 1966 move to Atlanta, before his dismissal that year.

Regular season

Batting 
Right fielder Hank Aaron won the National League batting championship with a career-high .355 batting average. He also led the league in hits with 223, total bases with 400—both also career highs—and slugging percentage at .636. Aaron finished third in the voting for the National League Most Valuable Player award. Aaron also led the Braves with 154 games played, 629 at bats, and 123 runs batted in.

Third baseman Eddie Mathews led the NL with 46 home runs and had a career-high 182 hits, and he led the National League. He also led the team with 118 runs scored, had 182 hits and drove in 114 runs. Mathews finished second to Ernie Banks of the Chicago Cubs in the voting for the league's Most Valuable Player, who hit 47 home runs and lead the league in runs batted in. The choice was controversial, as the Cubs finished in last place, but Aaron and Mathews split the voting among Braves players, allowing Banks to claim the award.

Pitching 
Warren Spahn and Lew Burdette led the National League pitchers with 21 wins apiece, and they had identical 21–15 win–loss records in carrying the Braves on their backs for most of the season. Spahn, who was the starting pitcher in the All-Star Game, pitched 292 innings, and Burdette pitched 289.2 innings. Third starter Bob Buhl returned from a season full of injuries to pitch 198 innings and finish with a good 15–9 record.

The star of the bullpen was relief pitcher Don McMahon, who pitched in 60 games (finishing 49), had a 5–3 record, a 2.57 earned run average, and saved 15 games. McMahon was also chosen for the All-Star Game.

Season highlights 
On May 26, Harvey Haddix of the Pittsburgh Pirates pitched a perfect game through 12 innings of a game against the Braves. Haddix retired the first 36 consecutive batters, but lost the game 1–0 in the 13th inning. Félix Mantilla broke up the perfect game in the 13th inning. Braves pitcher Lew Burdette also pitched a shutout for all thirteen innings, giving up 12 hits and no walks.

Season standings 

 Includes best-of-three tie-breaking series

Record vs. opponents

Notable transactions 
 April 11, 1959: Humberto Robinson was traded by the Braves to the Cleveland Indians for Mickey Vernon.
 May 11, 1959: Claude Raymond was returned to the Braves by the Chicago White Sox.
 May 26, 1959: Phil Roof was signed as an amateur free agent by the Braves.
 July 19, 1959: Len Gabrielson was signed as an amateur free agent by the Braves.
 August 20, 1959: Ray Boone was selected off waivers by the Braves from the Kansas City Athletics.
 August 26, 1959: Del Rice was released by the Braves as an active player and signed as a coach.
 September 11, 1959: Enos Slaughter was selected off waivers by the Braves from the New York Yankees.
 October 24, 1959: Rico Carty was signed by the Braves as an amateur free agent.

Roster

Player stats

Batting

Starters by position 
Note: Pos = Position; G = Games played; AB = At bats; H = Hits; Avg. = Batting average; HR = Home runs; RBI = Runs batted in

Other batters 
Note: G = Games played; AB = At bats; H = Hits; Avg. = Batting average; HR = Home runs; RBI = Runs batted in

Pitching

Starting pitchers 
Note: G = Games pitched; IP = Innings pitched; W = Wins; L = Losses; ERA = Earned run average; SO = Strikeouts

Other pitchers 
Note: G = Games pitched; IP = Innings pitched; W = Wins; L = Losses; ERA = Earned run average; SO = Strikeouts

Relief pitchers 
Note: G = Games pitched; W = Wins; L = Losses; SV = Saves; ERA = Earned run average; SO = Strikeouts

Farm system 

LEAGUE CHAMPIONS: Austin, Yakima, McCook, Wellsville

Notes

References 

1959 Milwaukee Braves season at Baseball Reference

Milwaukee Braves seasons
Milwaukee Braves season
Milwau